Albrecht Moritz James Karl Schoenhals (7 March 1888 – 4 December 1978) was a German film actor.

Life 
Born Moritz James Karl, Albrecht Schoenhals was the son of the German General upper physician Gustav Schoenhals (1855-1930) and an English mother. He grew up in Freiburg/Breisgau and then studied medicine in Berlin. Subsequently, he worked for a Berlin charity as a doctor and then volunteered as an army doctor for the field artillery regimen to Metz on the western front during World War I. In the last year of the war, he suffered a serious wound to his arm and was invalided out of service in 1918. While recovering, he wrote his doctoral thesis and joined a volunteer corps of the Army School Döberitz.

Schoenhals had originally hoped to become a surgeon, but he was unable to pursue this path due to his arm injury. Instead, he took acting classes under Eduard von Winterstein in Freiburg. He received his first stage engagement in 1920 at the City Theater Freiburg (Stadttheater Freiburg), where he played Orest in Goethe's Iphigenie auf Tauris. He worked in Halberstadt, in Freiburg (1921-1924), in Baden-Baden, Frankfurt, Dortmund, and at the Hamburger Kammerspiele (1928-1934), where he was an ensemble member.

He married the actress Anneliese Born in 1930 and their son Kai was born in 1933.

In 1934, while working in Hamburg, a casting director from the UFA discovered Schoenhals and selected him as a double for Arthur Robison's romance Prince Woronzeff. Schoenhals subsequently had a successful film career, starring in German romantic melodramas of the 1930s and 1940s, where he was adept at playing the role of aristocrats, senior officers, and professional men of considerable stature, such as surgeons, concert violinists, and so forth. He was known for his considerable charm and elegant appearance. However, under the seemingly impeccable veneer his charisma-like charm, Schoenhals exhibited the capacity to play the villain, such as in the Willi Forst crime film Mazurka. In this film, he portrays a rapist who is shot many years later by his victim, played by Pola Negri. In the romance , Schoenhals starred as a mysterious player who exploited the plight of an opera diva, forcing her to purchase the rights to her own voice. In Veit Harlan's Tolstoy film Die Kreutzersonate, he seduced a married woman. In a number of other films, he portrayed very reliable and upstanding characters, including the film Roman eines Arztes, where he portrays a man who goes to jail in his wife's stead, after she is convicted of murder.

Albrecht Schoenhals starred alongside the Divas of UFA, Pola Negri, Camilla Horn and Sybille Schmitz, as well as the "Darlings" of the Nazi leadership, Lil Dagover, Olga Chekhova and Lída Baarová. His career ended abruptly in 1940 when he fell out of favor with the Nazi regime for refusing to play the title role in Jud Süß, an antisemitic propaganda film. From then on, he was cast in only a few films, and was forced in 1941 to participate in a Nazi propaganda film for children entitled Kopf hoch, Johannes! (Cheer Up, Johannes!). In this film, a teenage boy is spoiled hopelessly by his mother while his father is not around. Schoenhals plays a landowner who is bothered by the boy, and he is taught a sense of camaraderie. Following the film, Schoenhals withdrew from the theater to his estate in Baden-Baden, "Annenhof."

After the end of World War II, he worked as a doctor at the city hospital of Baden-Baden. In the late 1940s, he and his wife returned to the theater. He continued to star alongside leading actresses and play men of high rank. He began to be cast more as a supporting actor and eventually faded into the background. From 1956 to 1968, Schoenhals was involved in many television productions. From the early 1960s onward, he also devoted himself increasingly to his personal interests, such as French literature, a field in which he was an active translator and editor. He was occasionally a stage director and focused on translation of original French plays into German. In 1965, Schoenhals received the German Film Award for "long-standing and outstanding achievements in German film." In 1967, he received the Federal Cross of Merit. He returned to film in 1969 for a supporting role in Luchino Visconti's film The Damned. He died at age 90 and was buried at a cemetery in Baden-Baden.

Partial filmography

References

External links 
 

1888 births
1978 deaths
German male film actors
German people of English descent
Actors from Mannheim
Commanders Crosses of the Order of Merit of the Federal Republic of Germany
Recipients of the Order of Merit of Baden-Württemberg
20th-century German male actors
20th-century Freikorps personnel